The Decapoda or decapods (literally "ten-footed") are an order of crustaceans within the class Malacostraca, including many familiar groups, such as crabs, lobsters, crayfish, shrimp and prawns. Most decapods are scavengers. The order is estimated to contain nearly 15,000 species in around 2,700 genera, with around 3,300 fossil species. Nearly half of these species are crabs, with the shrimp (about 3,000 species) and Anomura including hermit crabs, porcelain crabs, squat lobsters (about 2500 species) making up the bulk of the remainder. The earliest fossil decapod is the Devonian Palaeopalaemon.

Anatomy

Decapods can have as many as 38 appendages, arranged in one pair per body segment. They are the pereiopods, found on the last five thoracic segments. In many decapods, one pair of these "legs" has enlarged pincers, called chelae, with the legs being called chelipeds. In front of the pereiopods are three pairs of maxillipeds that function as feeding appendages. The head has five pairs of appendages, including mouthparts, antennae, and antennules. There are five more pairs of appendages on the abdomen. They are called pleopods. There is one final pair called uropods, which, with the telson, form the tail fan.

Evolution
Decapods originated in the Late Ordovician around 455 million years ago, with the Dendrobranchiata (prawns) being the first group to diverge.  The remaining group, called Pleocyemata, then diverged between the swimming shrimp groupings and the crawling/walking group called Reptantia, consisting of lobsters and crabs.  High species diversification can be traced to the Jurassic and Cretaceous periods, which coincides with the rise and spread of modern coral reefs, a key habitat for the decapods.

The cladogram below results from analysis by Wolfe et al. (2019).

Classification
Classification within the order Decapoda depends on the structure of the gills and legs, and the way in which the larvae develop, giving rise to two suborders: Dendrobranchiata and Pleocyemata. The Dendrobranchiata consist of prawns, including many species colloquially referred to as "shrimp", such as the "white shrimp", Litopenaeus setiferus. The Pleocyemata include the remaining groups, including "true shrimp". Those groups that usually walk rather than swim (Pleocyemata, excluding Stenopodidea and Caridea) form a clade called Reptantia.

This classification to the level of superfamilies follows De Grave et al.

Order Decapoda Latreille, 1802
Suborder Dendrobranchiata Bate, 1888
Penaeoidea Rafinesque, 1815
Sergestoidea Dana, 1852
Suborder Pleocyemata Burkenroad, 1963
Infraorder Stenopodidea Bate, 1888
Infraorder Caridea Dana, 1852
Procaridoidea Chace & Manning, 1972
Galatheacaridoidea Vereshchaka, 1997
Pasiphaeoidea Dana, 1852
Oplophoroidea Dana, 1852
Atyoidea De Haan, 1849
Bresilioidea Calman, 1896
Nematocarcinoidea Smith, 1884
Psalidopodoidea Wood-....., 1874
Stylodactyloidea Bate, 1888
Campylonotoidea Sollaud, 1913
Palaemonoidea Rafinesque, 1815
Alpheoidea Rafinesque, 1815
Processoidea Ortmann, 1896
Pandaloidea Haworth, 1825
Physetocaridoidea Chace, 1940
Crangonoidea Haworth, 1825
Infraorder Astacidea Latreille, 1802
Enoplometopoidea de Saint Laurent, 1988
Nephropoidea Dana, 1852
Astacoidea Latreille, 1802
Parastacoidea Huxley, 1879
Infraorder Glypheidea Winckler, 1882
Glypheoidea Winckler, 1882
Infraorder Axiidea de Saint Laurent, 1979b
Infraorder Gebiidea de Saint Laurent, 1979
Infraorder Achelata Scholtz & Richter, 1995
Infraorder Polychelida Scholtz & Richter, 1995
Infraorder Anomura MacLeay, 1838
Aegloidea Dana, 1852
Galatheoidea Samouelle, 1819
Hippoidea Latreille, 1825a
Chirostyloidea Ortmann, 1892 
Lithodoidea Samouelle, 1819
Lomisoidea Bouvier, 1895
Paguroidea Latreille, 1802
Infraorder Brachyura Linnaeus, 1758
Section Dromiacea De Haan, 1833
Dromioidea De Haan, 1833
Homolodromioidea Alcock, 1900
Homoloidea De Haan, 1839
Section Raninoida De Haan, 1839
Section Cyclodorippoida Ortmann, 1892
Section Eubrachyura de Saint Laurent, 1980
Subsection Heterotremata Guinot, 1977
Aethroidea Dana, 1851
Bellioidea Dana, 1852
Bythograeoidea Williams, 1980
Calappoidea De Haan, 1833
Cancroidea Latreille, 1802
Carpilioidea Ortmann, 1893
Cheiragonoidea Ortmann, 1893
Corystoidea Samouelle, 1819
Dairoidea Serène, 1965
Dorippoidea MacLeay, 1838
Eriphioidea MacLeay, 1838
Gecarcinucoidea Rathbun, 1904
Goneplacoidea MacLeay, 1838
Hexapodoidea Miers, 1886
Leucosioidea Samouelle, 1819
Majoidea Samouelle, 1819
Orithyioidea Dana, 1852c
Palicoidea Bouvier, 1898
Parthenopoidea MacLeay,
Pilumnoidea Samouelle, 1819
Portunoidea Rafinesque, 1815
Potamoidea Ortmann, 1896
Pseudothelphusoidea Ortmann, 1893
Pseudozioidea Alcock, 1898
Retroplumoidea Gill, 1894
Trapezioidea Miers, 1886
Trichodactyloidea H. Milne-Edwards, 1853
Xanthoidea MacLeay, 1838
Subsection Thoracotremata Guinot, 1977
Cryptochiroidea Paul'son, 1875
Grapsoidea MacLeay, 1838
Ocypodoidea Rafinesque, 1815
Pinnotheroidea De Haan, 1833

See also

List of Atlantic decapod species
Phylogeny of Malacostraca

References

External links

 Decapod Crustacea "Tree of Life" page at the Natural History Museum of Los Angeles County
 

 
Crustacean orders
Malacostraca
Extant Devonian first appearances
Taxa named by Pierre André Latreille